Thienorphine is a very potent, extremely long-acting, orally-active opioid analgesic with mixed agonist–antagonist properties which was developed by the Beijing Institute of Pharmacology and Toxicology as a potential treatment for opioid dependence. It is a high-affinity, balanced ligand of the μ- (Ki = 0.22 nM), δ- (Ki = 0.69 nM), and κ-opioid receptors (Ki = 0.14 nM), behaving as a partial agonist of the μ- (Emax = 19%–28%) and κ-opioid receptors (Emax = 65–75%) and as an antagonist of the δ-opioid receptor. It also possesses relatively low affinity for the nociceptin receptor (Ki = 36.5 nM), where it acts as an antagonist.

See also
 Buprenorphine
 Etorphine
 Dihydroetorphine
 Diprenorphine

References

Delta-opioid receptor antagonists
Drug rehabilitation
4,5-Epoxymorphinans
Kappa-opioid receptor agonists
Mu-opioid receptor agonists
Mu-opioid receptor antagonists
Nociceptin receptor antagonists
Oripavines
Semisynthetic opioids
Thiophenes
Cyclopropanes